Shepherd's Grove  is a congregation of the Presbyterian Church (USA) in Irvine, California, United States. The church was founded by Robert H. Schuller in 1955 as the Garden Grove Community Church and renamed to Crystal Cathedral Ministries after its church building, the Crystal Cathedral, in 1981. The congregation is known worldwide as the producer of the Hour of Power weekly Christian television program.

On October 18, 2010, the board of Crystal Cathedral Ministries filed for bankruptcy in Santa Ana, California. In February 2012, as part of the bankruptcy proceeding, the congregation sold the Crystal Cathedral building to the Roman Catholic Diocese of Orange. Under the terms of the sale, Crystal Cathedral Ministries leased the building from the diocese until July 2013. The congregation was housed on the former site of St. Callistus Catholic church and school in Garden Grove until March 2018.

The Presbytery of Los Ranchos approved a proposed lease agreement between Shepherd's Grove and Irvine Presbyterian Church (IPC) on February 24, 2018. The first services at IPC were held on March 25, 2018.  Shepherd's Grove intends to merge with IPC into the Presbyterian Church (USA).

Origins

A congregation of the Reformed Church in America, the Garden Grove Community Church was founded in 1955 by Robert H. Schuller and his wife Arvella. The first church services were held in space rented from the Orange Drive-In Theatre.

In 1961, the congregation moved to a new sanctuary designed by architect Richard Neutra. In 1968, The Tower of Hope was completed, providing office and classroom space.  Continued growth led to the need for a new facility. Schuller envisioned a unique facility with walls made of glass and commissioned noted architect Philip Johnson to put his dream into reality. Construction on the Crystal Cathedral began in 1977 and was completed in 1980, built at a cost of $18 million. Upon moving from the old Neutra sanctuary to the new Johnson sanctuary, the congregation changed its name to the Crystal Cathedral.

Ministers
On January 22, 2006, Schuller retired as the senior pastor of the Crystal Cathedral. His son, Robert A. Schuller, was installed as the second senior pastor of the church and head of the Hour of Power TV program. On October 25, 2008, the elder Schuller announced the removal of his son from the Hour of Power broadcast, citing "a lack of shared vision". In a prepared statement, Robert H. Schuller stated that "different ideas as to the direction and the vision for this ministry" with his son "made it necessary ... to part ways in the Hour of Power television ministry". It was subsequently announced, on November 29, 2008, that Robert A. Schuller had resigned from his position as senior pastor of the Crystal Cathedral. 
Juan Carlos Ortiz was named as interim senior pastor while the search for a permanent replacement was conducted. Robert H. Schuller stated in a press release, "All the services will continue to be broadcast from the world-renowned Crystal Cathedral with our great tradition of the most beautiful church music in the world." Sheila Schuller Coleman later replaced her brother as the senior pastor, vowing to continue the original vision of her father's ministry. Coleman subsequently changed the format of the service to a more contemporary style with praise and worship bands in place of the traditional choir and organ. Attendance, however, declined until the church could no longer pay its bills. Prior to Coleman's departure the worship service attendance had dwindled to fewer than 400 people.

On March 10, 2012, it was announced that Robert H. Schuller and his wife, Arvella, had resigned from the church's board. The following day, Sheila Schuller Coleman announced at the morning service that she was leaving the church, stating that "This is the last Sunday we will be worshiping in this building." After the departure of Sheila Coleman, and the reinstatement of the more traditional worship style, attendance began to increase once again with previous long time members returning to the church. The increase in attendance and giving came too late, however, as the church had already been sold.

Music
From its inception, the Hour of Power was known for the quality of its music program and the eclectic variety of its musical guests. This was in part due to the efforts of Arvella Schuller, an organist and wife of the founding pastor. Minister of Music Don G. Fontana, organist/choral director Frederick Swann and orchestra director Johnnie Carl were commissioned to create and maintain a strong musical voice for the Crystal Cathedral. Upon Swann's retirement, Don Neuen was hired as choir director in 1999.

On December 16, 2004, Carl fired several bullets in his office within the church shortly before the beginning of the annual The Glory of Christmas program. The area was vacant at the time and no one was injured. Carl then barricaded himself in a bathroom and eventually ended a nine-hour standoff with police by fatally shooting himself. In his 29 years as orchestra director, Carl wrote more than 3,500 arrangements in his service to the Crystal Cathedral. At the time of his death, he was 57 years old. After Carl's death, composer Marc Riley replaced him as the orchestra director.

The traditional music program was led by Fontana, Swann, Neuen, Riley, and various organists including Richard Unfreid, Frederick Swann, Mark Thallander, Peter Baichi, Heather Hinton, J. Christopher Pardini, Sean Groombridge, and Thomas Leonard, until 2010.

Leadership at the Crystal Cathedral began "vetting" choir members to ensure they were "emotionally and spiritually fit" as well as asking them to sign a covenant regarding homosexual behavior to which some members objected.

Under Sheila Schuller Coleman's leadership, worship changed from a traditional hymn-based style to a "praise" style, culminating with the naming of Scott V. Smith and Debbie McClendon Smith as worship and music leaders. In March 2012, Coleman announced her departure as head pastor. Since then, the services at the Crystal Cathedral and the Hour of Power television program have returned to traditional music and choir.  Now known as Shepherd's Grove, many previously involved with the music ministry have returned:  Don Neuen was succeeded by choral director Irene Messoloras, and Marc Riley serves as orchestra director.  Sae Wan Yang is senior organist, and John von Wolzogen serves as handbell director.

Hour of Power broadcast

The Crystal Cathedral broadcast church services around the world on a television show called the Hour of Power, which at one point attracted 1.3 million viewers in 156 countries. The church provided facilities for those of a similar faith to congregate and offered campus services including support groups, Sunday school classes and daily Christian gatherings.

The church featured the testimonies of prominent people during the Hour of Power services. Notable guests have included former USSR president Mikhail Gorbachev, former president of India A. P. J. Abdul Kalam, former United States Vice President Al Gore, former United States Attorney General John Ashcroft, former Arkansas governor Mike Huckabee, noted Catholic broadcaster Archbishop Fulton J. Sheen, musician John Tesh, Christian singer Jaci Velasquez, pianist Roger Williams, flautist Sir James Galway, Christian singer Joy Williams, Backstreet Boys member and Christian singer Brian Littrell, Christian singer Natalie Grant, Christian rock band Sonicflood, singer Robert Sims, American tenor Daniel Rodriguez, musical group the Oak Ridge Boys, Christian singer Sara Groves, Irish tenor Ronan Tynan; former tennis star Michael Chang, actors Kirk Douglas, Roy Rogers, Noah Gray-Cabey, and Denzel Washington, radio talk-show host Laura Schlessinger, and MLB baseball player Kirk Gibson.

2010 bankruptcy application
Beginning in 2010, creditors filed lawsuits to collect money due to them for providing goods, services and broadcasting The Hour of Power weekly TV show. A board member said that the total debt was $55 million. The church's board filed for bankruptcy on October 18, 2010, citing $43 million in debt including a $36 million mortgage and $7.5 million in other debt.  Church officials said that they had been trying to negotiate payments but after several suits were filed and writs of attachment were granted the church had to declare bankruptcy. The church received offers for the Crystal Cathedral from a real estate investment group and from Chapman University, both with the provision of being leased back to the church.

On July 7, 2011, the Roman Catholic Diocese of Orange announced that it was “potentially interested” in buying the church building.  On November 17, 2011, a federal judge approved selling the Crystal Cathedral to the Diocese of Orange. After renovations, the building was rededicated as the cathedral for the Catholic diocese in 2019 under its new name of Christ Cathedral, replacing the Holy Family Cathedral which had previously served the diocese.

References

External links

 

Presbyterian churches in California
California culture
Churches in Orange County, California
Christian organizations established in 1955
Reformed Church in America churches
Culture of Garden Grove, California
Richard Neutra buildings
1955 establishments in California